National Highway 931A, commonly referred to as NH 931A is a national highway in  India. It is a spur road of National Highway 31. NH-931A traverses the state of Uttar Pradesh in India.

Route 
Salon, Jais, Jagdishpur.

Junctions  

  Terminal near Salon.
  near Jais.
  Terminal near Jagdishpur.

See also 

 List of National Highways in India
 List of National Highways in India by state

References

External links 

 NH 931A on OpenStreetMap

National highways in India
National Highways in Uttar Pradesh